This article lists feature-length British films and full-length documentaries that have their premiere in 2019 and were at least partly produced by Great Britain or the United Kingdom. It does not feature short films, medium-length films, made-for-TV films, pornographic films, filmed theater, VR films and interactive films. It also does not include films screened in previous years that had official release dates in 2019.

Also included is an overview of five awards ceremonies which are major events in British film: the Academy Awards, British Academy Film Awards, Critics' Choice Awards, Golden Globe Awards and Screen Actors Guild Awards.

Film premieres

January – March

April – June

July – September

October – December

Other premieres

Culturally British films
The following list comprises films not produced by Great Britain or the United Kingdom but is strongly associated with British culture. The films in this list should fulfill at least 3 of the following criteria:
 The film is adapted from a British source material.
 The story is at least partially set in the United Kingdom.
 The film was at least partially shot in the United Kingdom.
 Many of the film's cast and crew members are British.

Judy and Punch fulfills two of the above criteria as it is based on the English tradition of puppetry and is set in 17th century England. However, it was filmed entirely in Australia with Australian cast and crew.

British winners

Listed here are the British winners and nominees at the five most prestigious film award ceremonies in the English-speaking world: the Academy Awards, British Academy Film Awards, Critics' Choice Awards, Golden Globe Awards and Screen Actors Guild Awards, that were held during 2019, celebrating the best films of 2018. The British nominations were led by Bohemian Rhapsody which, along with The Favourite, also lead in the technical categories. British films did, however, notably lose out to Roma from Mexico and Green Book from USA. British VFX artists, sound designers and sound mixers led the technical categories for American films like First Man, Ready Player One and Solo: A Star Wars Story.

Academy Awards
The 91st Academy Awards honoring the best films of 2018 will be held on February 24, 2019.

British winners:
 Bohemian Rhapsody (Best Actor, Best Sound Editing, Best Sound Mixing, Best Film Editing)
 The Favourite (Best Actress)
 John Casali (Best Sound Mixing) – Bohemian Rhapsody
 Mark Ronson (Best Original Song) – "Shallow" (A Star Is Born)
 Nina Hartstone (Best Sound Editing) – Bohemian Rhapsody
 Olivia Colman (Best Actress) – The Favourite
 Paul Massey (Best Sound Mixing) – Bohemian Rhapsody
 Tim Cavagin (Best Sound Mixing) – Bohemian Rhapsody

British nominees:
 At Eternity's Gate (Best Actor)
 Bohemian Rhapsody (Best Picture)
 Cold War (Best Director, Best Foreign Language Film, Best Cinematography)
 The Favourite (Best Picture, Best Director, Best Supporting Actress, Best Original Screenplay, Best Production Design, Best Cinematography, Best Costume Design, Best Film Editing)
 Mary Queen of Scots (Best Makeup & Hairstyling, Best Costume Design)
 The Wife (Best Actress)
 Alexandra Byrne (Best Costume Design) – Mary Queen of Scots
 Alice Felton (Best Production Design) – The Favourite
 Alison Snowden (Best Animated Short Film) – Animal Behaviour
 Barry Alexander Brown (Best Original Score) – BlacKkKlansman
 Chris Lawrence (Best Visual Effects) – Christopher Robin
 Chris Corbould (Best Visual Effects) – Christopher Robin
 Christian Bale (Best Actor) – Vice
 David Shirk (Best Visual Effects) – Ready Player One
 Deborah Davis (Best Original Screenplay) – The Favourite
 Dominic Tuohy (Best Visual Effects) – Solo: A Star Wars Story
 Graham King (Best Picture) – Bohemian Rhapsody
 Jenny Shircore (Best Makeup & Hairstyling) – Mary Queen of Scots
 Marc Pilcher (Best Makeup & Hairstyling) – Mary Queen of Scots
 Matthew E. Butler (Best Visual Effects) – Ready Player One
 Michael Eames (Best Visual Effects) – Christopher Robin
 Nathan Crowley (Best Production Design) – First Man
 Neal Scanlan (Best Visual Effects) – Solo: A Star Wars Story
 Paul Lambert (Best Visual Effects) – First Man
 Rachel Weisz (Best Supporting Actress) – The Favourite
 Roger Guyett (Best Visual Effects) – Ready Player One
 Richard E. Grant (Best Supporting Actor) – Can You Ever Forgive Me?
 Sandy Powell (Best Costume Design) – The Favourite and Mary Poppins Returns
 Theo Jones (Best Visual Effects) – Christopher Robin
 Tristan Myles (Best Visual Effects) – First Man

British Academy Film Awards
The 72nd British Academy Film Awards honoring the best films of 2018 were held on 10 February 2019.

British winners:
 Beast (Outstanding Debut by a British Writer, Director or Producer)
 Bohemian Rhapsody (Best Actor, Best Sound)
 The Favourite (Outstanding British Film, Best Original Screenplay, Best Actress, Best Supporting Actress, Best Production Design, Best Costume Design, Best Makeup & Hair)
 Roughhouse (Best British Short Animation)
 Alex Lockwood (Best British Short Documentary) - 73 Cows
 Alice Felton (Best Production Design) – The Favourite
 Beverley Binda (Best Makeup & Hair) – The Favourite
 Deborah Davis (Best Original Screenplay) – The Favourite
 Elizabeth Karlsen (Outstanding British Contribution To Cinema)
 Jonathan Hodgson (Best British Short Animation) - Roughhouse
 Lauren Dark (Outstanding Debut by a British Writer, Director or Producer) – Beast
 Letitia Wright (BAFTA Rising Star)
 Michael Pearce (Outstanding Debut by a British Writer, Director or Producer) – Beast
 Olivia Colman (Best Actress) – The Favourite
 Rachel Weisz (Best Supporting Actress) – The Favourite
 Roger Pratt (Outstanding Contribution to Cinematography)
 Sandy Powell (Best Costume Design) – The Favourite
 Sue Bruce-Smith (Outstanding Contribution to Cinema)
 73 Cows (Best British Short Film)

British nominees:
 Apostasy (Outstanding Debut by a British Writer, Director or Producer)
 Beast (Outstanding British Film)
 Bohemian Rhapsody (Outstanding British Film, Best Cinematography, Best Editing, Best Costume Design, Best Makeup & Hair)
 Cold War (Best Film Not in the English language, Best Director, Best Original Screenplay, Best Cinematography)
 Fantastic Beasts: The Crimes of Grindelwald (Best Production Design, Best Special Visual Effects)
 The Favourite (Best Film, Best Director, Best Supporting Actress, Best Cinematography, Best Editing)
 Mary Queen of Scots (Best Supporting Actress, Best Costume Design, Best Makeup & Hair)
 McQueen (Outstanding British Film, Best Documentary)
 Ray & Liz (Outstanding Debut by a British Writer, Director or Producer)
 Stan & Ollie (Outstanding British Film, Best Actor, Best Makeup & Hair)
 Widows (Best Actress)
 The Wife (Best Actress)
 They Shall Not Grow Old (Best Documentary)
 Three Identical Strangers (Best Documentary)
 You Were Never Really Here (Outstanding British Film)
 Alexandra Byrne (Best Costume Design) – Mary Queen of Scots
 The Brothers McLeod (Best British Short Animation) – Marfa
 Claire Foy (Best Supporting Actress) – First Man
 Chris Kelly (Outstanding Debut by a British Writer, Director or Producer) – A Cambodian Spring
 Christian Bale (Best Actor) – Vice
 Cynthia Erivo (BAFTA Rising Star)
 Daniel Kokotajlo (Outstanding Debut by a British Writer, Director or Producer) – Apostasy
 Jacqui Davies (Outstanding Debut by a British Writer, Director or Producer) – Ray & Liz
 Jan Sewell (Best Makeup & Hair) – Bohemian Rhapsody
 Jenny Shircore (Best Makeup & Hair) – Mary Queen of Scots
 Julian Day (Best Costume Design) – Bohemian Rhapsody
 Leanne Welham (Outstanding Debut by a British Writer, Director or Producer) – Pili
 Nathan Crowley (Best Production Design) – First Man
 Richard Billingham (Outstanding Debut by a British Writer, Director or Producer) – Ray & Liz
 Richard E. Grant (Best Supporting Actor) – Can You Ever Forgive Me?
 Sandy Powell (Best Costume Design) – Mary Poppins Returns
 Sophie Harman (Outstanding Debut by a British Writer, Director or Producer) – Pili
 Stephen Woolley (Outstanding British Contribution To Cinema)
 Steve Coogan (Best Actor) – Stan & Ollie
 Stuart Craig (Best Production Design) – Fantastic Beasts: The Crimes of Grindelwald
 Bachelor, 38 (Best British Short Film)
 The Blue Door (Best British Short Film)
 The Field  (Best British Short Film)
 I'm OK (Best British Short Animation)
 Marfa (Best British Short Animation)
 Wale (Best British Short Film)

Critics' Choice Awards
The 24th Critics' Choice Awards was presented on January 13, 2019.

British winners:
 The Favourite (Best Acting Ensemble, Best Actress in a Comedy)
 The Wife (Best Actress)
 Christian Bale (Best Actor, Best Actor in a Comedy) – Vice
 Claire Foy - #SeeHer Award
 Mark Ronson (Best Original Song) – "Shallow" (A Star Is Born)
 Olivia Colman (Best Acting Ensemble, Best Actress in a Comedy) – The Favourite
 Nicholas Hoult (Best Acting Ensemble) – The Favourite
 Rachel Weisz (Best Acting Ensemble) – The Favourite

British nominees:
 Annihilation (Best Sci-fi or Horror Movie)
 At Eternity's Gate (Best Actor)
 Bohemian Rhapsody (Best Actor, Best Costume Design, Best Hair & Makeup)
 Cold War (Best Foreign Language Film)
 The Death of Stalin (Best Comedy)
 The Favourite (Best Picture, Best Actress, Best Supporting Actress, Best Director, Best Original Screenplay, Best Cinematography, Best Production Design, Best Editing, Best Costume Design, Best Hair & Makeup, Best Comedy)
 Mary Queen of Scots (Best Costume Design, Best Hair & Makeup)
 Stan & Ollie (Best Actor in a Comedy)
 Widows (Best Acting Ensemble, Best Editing, Best Action Movie)
 Adam Gough (Best Editing) – Roma
 Al Shuckburgh (Best Original Song) – "All the Stars" (Black Panther)
 Alexandra Byrne (Best Costume Design) – Mary Queen of Scots
 Alice Felton (Best Production Design) – The Favourite
 Claire Foy (Best Supporting Actress) – First Man
 Deborah Davis (Best Original Screenplay) – The Favourite
 Emily Blunt (Best Actress, Best Actress in a Comedy) – Mary Poppins Returns
 Joe Walker (Best Editing) – Widows
 Julian Day (Best Costume Design) – Bohemian Rhapsody
 Nathan Crowley (Best Production Design) – First Man
 Olivia Colman (Best Actress) – The Favourite
 Rachel Weisz (Best Supporting Actress) – The Favourite
 Richard E. Grant (Best Supporting Actor) – Can You Ever Forgive Me?
 Sandy Powell (Best Costume Design) – The Favourite and Mary Poppins Returns

Golden Globe Awards
The 76th Golden Globe Awards was presented on January 6, 2019.

British winners:
 Bohemian Rhapsody (Best Motion Picture - Drama, Best Performance in a Motion Picture – Drama)
 The Favourite (Best Performance in a Motion Picture – Musical or Comedy)
 The Wife (Best Performance in a Motion Picture – Drama)
 Christian Bale (Best Performance in a Motion Picture – Musical or Comedy) – Vice
 Mark Ronson (Best Original Song) – "Shallow" (A Star Is Born)
 Olivia Colman (Best Performance in a Motion Picture – Musical or Comedy) – The Favourite

British nominees:
 At Eternity's Gate (Best Performance in a Motion Picture – Drama)
 The Favourite (Best Motion Picture - Musical or Comedy, Best Supporting Performance in a Motion Picture, Best Screenplay)
 Stan & Ollie (Best Performance in a Motion Picture – Musical or Comedy)
 Al Shuckburgh (Best Original Song) – "All the Stars" (Black Panther)
 Annie Lennox (Best Original Song) – "Requiem for a Private War" (A Private War)
 Claire Foy (Best Supporting Performance in a Motion Picture) – First Man
 Deborah Davis (Best Screenplay) – The Favourite
 Emily Blunt (Best Performance in a Motion Picture – Musical or Comedy) – Mary Poppins Returns
 Rachel Weisz (Best Supporting Performance in a Motion Picture) – The Favourite
 Richard E. Grant (Best Supporting Performance in a Motion Picture) – Can You Ever Forgive Me?
 Rosamund Pike (Best Performance in a Motion Picture – Drama) – A Private War

Screen Actors Guild Awards
The 25th Screen Actors Guild Awards was presented on January 27, 2019.

British winners:
 Andy Serkis (Outstanding Performance by a Cast in a Motion Picture) – Black Panther
 Daniel Kaluuya (Outstanding Performance by a Cast in a Motion Picture) – Black Panther
 Emily Blunt (Outstanding Performance by a Female Actor in a Supporting Role in a Motion Picture) – A Quiet Place
 Letitia Wright (Outstanding Performance by a Cast in a Motion Picture) – Black Panther
 Martin Freeman (Outstanding Performance by a Cast in a Motion Picture) – Black Panther
 Bohemian Rhapsody (Outstanding Performance by a Male Actor in a Leading Role in a Motion Picture)
 The Wife (Outstanding Performance by a Female Actor in a Leading Role in a Motion Picture)

British nominees:
 Ben Hardy (Outstanding Performance by a Cast in a Motion Picture) – Bohemian Rhapsody
 Christian Bale (Outstanding Performance by a Male Actor in a Leading Role in a Motion Picture) – Vice
 Emily Blunt (Outstanding Performance by a Female Actor in a Leading Role in a Motion Picture) – Mary Poppins Returns
 Gemma Chan (Outstanding Performance by a Cast in a Motion Picture) – Crazy Rich Asians
 Gwilym Lee (Outstanding Performance by a Cast in a Motion Picture) – Bohemian Rhapsody
 Henry Golding (Outstanding Performance by a Cast in a Motion Picture) – Crazy Rich Asians
 Lucy Boynton - (Outstanding Performance by a Cast in a Motion Picture) – Bohemian Rhapsody
 Olivia Colman (Outstanding Performance by a Female Actor in a Leading Role in a Motion Picture) – The Favourite
 Rachel Weisz (Outstanding Performance by a Female Actor in a Supporting Role in a Motion Picture) – The Favourite
 Rafi Gavron (Outstanding Performance by a Cast in a Motion Picture) – A Star Is Born
 Richard E. Grant (Outstanding Performance by a Male Actor in a Supporting Role in a Motion Picture) – Can You Ever Forgive Me?
 Tom Hollander (Outstanding Performance by a Cast in a Motion Picture) - Bohemian Rhapsody
 Bohemian Rhapsody (Outstanding Performance By a Cast in a Motion Picture)
 The Favourite (Outstanding Performance by a Female Actor in a Leading Role in a Motion Picture, Outstanding Performance by a Female Actor in a Supporting Role in a Motion Picture)
 Mary Queen of Scots (Outstanding Performance by a Female Actor in a Supporting Role in a Motion Picture)

See also
Lists of British films
2019 in film
2019 in British music
2019 in British radio
2019 in British television
2019 in the United Kingdom
List of 2019 box office number-one films in the United Kingdom
List of British films of 2018
List of British films of 2020

References

External links
 

2019
Lists of 2019 films by country or language